The ballo was an Italian dance form during the fifteenth century, most noted for its frequent changes of tempo and meter. The name ballo has its origin in Latin ballō, ballāre, meaning "to dance", which in turn comes from the Greek "βαλλίζω" (ballizō), "to dance, to jump about". In Greece there is the Greek dance named Ballos.

Renaissance
During the Quattrocento balli were written by various composers, primarily the dance masters Domenico da Piacenza and Guglielmo Ebreo da Pesaro, who also wrote treatises including choreographies to their works.

Domenico wrote of the balli as dealing with four misure:
 The bassadanza, from the basse danse, consisting of what would now be labeled as a slow  or 
 The quadernaria, one-sixth faster than the Bassadanza
 The saltarello, two-sixths faster than the Bassadanza
 The piva, twice as fast as the Bassadanza

Baroque
The Renaissance dance should be distinguished from the early Baroque ballo, which was enlarged to include vocal numbers by such composers as Monteverdi (Il ballo delle ingrate), and Francesco Lambardi (Una festa a ballo).

See also
 Ballata

References

Further reading 
 Guglielmo Ebreo. De Pratica Seu Arte Tripudii: "On the Practice or Art of Dancing" 
 Domenico da Piacenza. De Arte Saltandi et Choreas Ducendi

External links 
  The 15th Century "balli" Tunes: A Look
  Italian Balli of the 15th Century
Italian dances
Renaissance dance